Jack Byrne (born 24 April 1996) is an Irish professional footballer who plays as a midfielder, for League of Ireland Premier Division club Shamrock Rovers. He has 4 caps for the Republic of Ireland national team, all coming in 2019–2020. He plays mainly as a midfielder but also can play as an attacking midfielder and winger.

Club career

Early career
Byrne started playing football for St Kevin's Boys at the age of five and moved to England to join Manchester City at the age of 15. In the 2014–15 season Byrne scored six goals in eight UEFA Youth League games for Manchester City under-19.

In the summer of 2015, Byrne joined Eredivisie side Cambuur on loan. After missing the first six weeks of the season due to an ankle injury picked up in pre-season, Byrne made his professional debut on 19 September in a match against FC Twente.

On 29 June 2016, Byrne joined EFL Championship club Blackburn Rovers. He went on to make four league appearances for the club before Blackburn cancelled his season long loan on 6 January 2017.

Wigan Athletic
Later in January 2017, Byrne joined Wigan Athletic for an undisclosed fee, signing a three-and-a-half year deal. He made his debut for the club as a second-half substitute in a 3–2 victory over Rotherham on 8 April 2017.

Oldham Athletic
On 15 January 2018, Byrne signed for Oldham Athletic for an undisclosed fee on a two-and-a-half-year deal. He was suspended by the club for an undisclosed, off the field incident, and subsequently released by Oldham Athletic on 31 August 2018, despite fan protests.

Kilmarnock
Soon after his release from Oldham, it was confirmed that Byrne had signed for Scottish Premiership side Kilmarnock on a one-year-deal.

Shamrock Rovers
On 7 December 2018, Byrne joined League of Ireland Premier Division club Shamrock Rovers. His first goal for the club was a spectacular strike in a 3–0 home win over Sligo Rovers on 15 March. After several strong performances Byrne was named Premier Division Player of the Month for March and again for July. He scored once and assisted five times in Rovers' Europa League ties against SK Brann and Apollon Limassol. He helped Shamrock Rovers to the 2019 FAI Cup Final in the Aviva Stadium where they faced holders Dundalk. Rovers won the game 4–2 after a Penalty shoot-out and won the Cup for the first time in 32 years. He was a member of the Rovers squad who won the 2020 League of Ireland Premier Division, the clubs first since 2011, when they went the whole season unbeaten. He ended the season being named in the PFAI Team of the Year as well as being voted as the PFAI Players' Player of the Year. On 2 January 2021, Byrne confirmed his departure from Shamrock Rovers 2 days after his contract had ended.

APOEL
On 4 January 2021, Byrne completed his switch over to Cyprus to sign with APOEL on a two and-a-half year deal, keeping him at the club until May 2023. On 24 September 2021, APOEL announced that Byrne had left the club by mutual consent after just 5 appearances during an injury plagued spell at the club.

Return to Shamrock Rovers
It was announced on 19 November 2021, that Byrne would return to Shamrock Rovers on a contract beginning in January 2022.

International career
Byrne has represented the Republic of Ireland up to Senior international level. He made his début for his country's Under-21 team when he was just 18 years old. He has since won 10 caps. He was called up to train with the Irish senior team by manager Martin O'Neill in March 2016, ahead of friendly matches against Switzerland and Slovakia, though Byrne did not feature in either game, instead returning to the Under-21 squad ahead of 2017 UEFA European Under-21 Championship Qualifying matches against Italy and Slovenia.

In March 2019, Byrne was called into the Republic of Ireland senior squad for the UEFA Euro 2020 qualifying Group D matches against Gibraltar on 23 March and Georgia on 26 March.

He was recalled to the national team in August 2019, making his international debut on 10 September 2019, coming off the bench and creating an assist in a 3–1 win over Bulgaria at the Aviva Stadium.

Byrne became the 500th Senior men’s International footballer to play for Ireland, and the 64th Shamrock Rovers player to play for Ireland while still playing for the club.

He played in the 2020–21 UEFA Nations League B#Group 4 away game against Wales, becoming the first home-based Irish international to play in a competitive game since 1985.

Byrne tested positive for COVID-19 while on international duty in October 2020. His club Shamrock Rovers confirmed this while also announcing that teammate Aaron Greene had tested positive. Byrne's manager Stephen Bradley said he was "probably the worst" affected. Byrne later reported having had breathing difficulties while ill.

Personal life
At the age of 11, Byrne lost his father, John.

Career statistics

Club

International

Honours

Club
Shamrock Rovers
 League of Ireland Premier Division: 2020, 2022
 FAI Cup: 2019
 President of Ireland's Cup: 2022

Individual
 PFAI Team of the Year (2): 2019, 2020
 PFAI Players' Player of the Year (2): 2019, 2020
 FAI League Player of the Year (2): 2019, 2020
 FAI Under-17 International Player of the Year (1): 2013
 League of Ireland Player of the Month (4): March 2019, July 2019, February 2020, September 2020

References

External links
 

Living people
1996 births
Republic of Ireland association footballers
Association football midfielders
Republic of Ireland international footballers
Republic of Ireland youth international footballers
Republic of Ireland under-21 international footballers
Eredivisie players
English Football League players
League of Ireland players
Scottish Professional Football League players
Cypriot First Division players
SC Cambuur players
Manchester City F.C. players
Blackburn Rovers F.C. players
Wigan Athletic F.C. players
Oldham Athletic A.F.C. players
Kilmarnock F.C. players
Shamrock Rovers F.C. players
St. Kevin's Boys F.C. players
APOEL FC players
Republic of Ireland expatriate association footballers
Irish expatriate sportspeople in the Netherlands
Expatriate footballers in the Netherlands
Expatriate footballers in Cyprus
Irish expatriate sportspeople in Cyprus